Ano Gerakari is a hilltop village and a community in the municipal unit of Alykes on the island of Zakynthos, Greece. In 2011 its population was 176 for the village and 709 for the community, which includes the villages Alonia and Kastelia. Ano Gerakari is adjacent to the northwest of Meso Gerakari, 4 km east of Katastari and 9 km northwest of Zakynthos city. It suffered great damage from the 1953 Ionian earthquake. 

With 526 inhabitants in 2011, Alonia is the largest village of the community. It lies northwest of Ano Gerakari, at the foot of the hill.

Population

See also

List of settlements in Zakynthos

External links
Gerakari at e-Zakynthos.com
Ano Gerakari at the GTP Travel Pages

References

Populated places in Zakynthos